Tog(s) or TOG(s) may refer to:
 ACM Transactions on Graphics, a scientific journal covering computer graphics
 Bruce Tognazzini's nickname 
 Clothing, sometimes referred to as "togs"
 Tog, short for "togman", a cloak or loose coat
 Swimming togs, a swimsuit, sometimes shortened to "togs"
 TOG (hackerspace), a hackerspace in Dublin, Ireland
 Tog (unit) of thermal insulation
 TOG1 and TOG II*, WWII UK tank prototypes
 TOGs, "Terry's Old Geezers/Gals", listeners of a UK radio show
 TOG, the List of IOC country codes (IOC code) of Togo
TOG superfamily of proteins.
 Tonga (Nyasa) language, ISO 639-2 code
 Turn Out Gear